Love Is Forever is the ninth studio album by Cliff Richard released in 1965 (sixteenth album overall). The album reached number 19 in the UK Album Charts and is primarily made up of pop standards such as "Long Ago (And Far Away)", "Have I Told You Lately That I Love You", and "Someday (You'll Want Me To Want You)".

The album was produced primarily by Richard's usual producer Norrie Paramor, but two songs "Everyone Needs to Love Someone" and "Through the Eye of a Needle", written by renowned song-writing duo Burt Bacharach and Hal David, were from Richard's August 1964 recording sessions in New York with Bob Morgan producing. Bob Morgan was from Epic Records, Richard's US record company at the time.

Track listing

The Shadows Are
Hank Marvin - Lead Guitar

Bruce Welch - Rhythm Guitar

Brian Bennett - Drums

John Rostill - Bass Guitar

Release formats
Vinyl, LP, mono

References

External links

Cliff Richard albums
1965 albums
Albums produced by Norrie Paramor
EMI Columbia Records albums
Albums recorded at CBS 30th Street Studio
Pop albums by English artists